The Stone Roses, an alternative rock band from Manchester, have had concerts and other live performances in Europe, North America, Australia, and Asia.

Tour dates

2012

On 18 October 2011, the Stone Roses called a press conference to confirm their reunion and two homecoming shows at Heaton Park, Manchester on 29 and 30 June 2012. They also stated their intention to complete a reunion world tour and an album of new material.

Further live dates
Several years after the initial reunion tour, the Stone Roses again came together to play a series of shows.

References

External links
 Stone Roses live tour dates
 Stone Roses live video and news

Live Performances
Stone Roses